Twyfelfontein (Afrikaans: uncertain spring), officially known as ǀUi-ǁAis (Damara/Nama: jumping waterhole), is a site of ancient rock engravings in the Kunene Region of north-western Namibia. It consists of a spring in a valley flanked by the slopes of a sandstone table mountain that receives very little rainfall and has a wide range of diurnal temperatures.

The site has been inhabited for 6,000 years, first by hunter-gatherers and later by Khoikhoi herders. Both ethnic groups used it as a place of worship and a site to conduct shamanist rituals. In the process of these rituals at least 2,500 items of rock carvings have been created, as well as a few rock paintings. Displaying one of the largest concentrations of rock petroglyphs in Africa, UNESCO approved Twyfelfontein as Namibia's first World Heritage Site in 2007.

History
Twyfelfontein valley has been inhabited by Stone-age hunter-gatherers of the Wilton stone age culture group since approximately 6,000 years ago. They made most of the engravings and probably all the paintings. 2,000 to 2,500 years ago the Khoikhoi, an ethnic group related to the San (Bushmen), occupied the valley, then known under its Damara/Nama name ǀUi-ǁAis (jumping waterhole). The Khoikhoi also produced rock art which can clearly be distinguished from the older engravings.

The area was uninhabited by Europeans until after World War II, when a severe drought caused white Afrikaans speaking farmers (Boers) to move in. The farm was later procured by the apartheid government as part of the Odendaal Plan and became part of the Damaraland bantustan. The white settlers left in 1965.

Topographer Reinhard Maack, who also discovered the White Lady rock painting at Brandberg, reported the presence of rock engravings in the area in 1921. A more thorough investigation was only conducted after David Levin studied the feasibility of farming in 1947. He rediscovered the spring but struggled to extract enough water to sustain his family and his herd. Slowly becoming obsessed with doubts about the capacity of the spring an Afrikaans-speaking friend began calling him David Twyfelfontein (David Doubts-the-spring) in jest. When Levin bought the land and registered his farm in 1948 he gave it the name Twyfelfontein. While commonly being translated as doubtful spring, a more accurate translation for the word twyfel is therefore "questionable" or "uncertain".

In 1950 scientific investigation of the rock art started with an investigation by Ernst Rudolph Scherz who described over 2500 rock engravings on 212 sandstone slabs.  it is estimated that the site contains more than 5000 individual depictions.

Location and description

Twyfelfontein is situated in the southern Kunene Region of Namibia, an area formerly known as Damaraland. The site lies on the banks of the Aba Huab River in the Huab valley of the Mount Etjo formation. The rocks containing the art work are situated in a valley flanked by the slopes of a sandstone table mountain. An underground aquifer on an impermeable layer of shale sustains a spring in this otherwise very dry area.
The name Twyfelfontein refers to the spring itself, to the valley containing the spring, and in the context of traveling and tourism also to a greater area containing nearby tourist attractions: the rock engravings, the Organ Pipes, Burnt Mountain, Doros crater, and the Petrified Forest. The World Heritage Site covers the area of rock engravings.

The area is a transitional zone between semi desert, savanna, and shrubland and receives less than  annual rainfall.

From there it is connected by the district road D3214. The Twyfelfontein Country Lodge features a gravel airstrip. The lodge, camp site, visitor's centre and most of the other tourist facilities are managed as a joint venture between the lodge owners and the Twyfelfontein-Uibasen Conservancy.

The rock art area consists of fourteen smaller sites that have been introduced by Scherz in his initial site survey. They are still used to describe the location of artworks in Twyfelfontein:

Artworks

Sandstone rocks at Twyfelfontein are covered by the so-called desert varnish, a hard patina that appears brown or dark grey. Engravings were effected by chiseling through this patina, exposing the lighter rock underneath. The indentations were created over the course of thousands of years. The oldest engravings might be as old as 10,000 years, and the creation of new works probably ended by the arrival of pastoral tribes around 1000 AD. 
Three different types of engravings can be distinguished at Twyfelfontein: 
 iconic imagery (images of animals, humans, and fantasy creatures)
 pictograms (geometric rock art like pecked circles, rows of dots)
 indentations for or from everyday use (grinding hollows, board games, gong stones)
Additionally, the site contains rock paintings at 13 different locations, with depictions of humans painted in red ochre in six rock shelters. The similar occurrence of rock paintings and rock engravings is very rare.

The hunter-gatherers made most of the iconic engravings and probably all the paintings. The carvings represent animals such as rhinoceroses, elephants, ostriches and giraffes as well as depictions of human and animal footprints. Some of the figures, most prominently the "Lion Man"—a lion with an extremely long rectangular kinked tail ending in a six-toed pugmark— depict the transformation of humans into animals. This transformation and the depiction of animals together with their tracks make it likely that they were created as part of shamanist rituals. The more simplistic perception that they only show hunter-gatherers' attempts to acquire food is now thought to be naïve.

A modern archaeological survey led by Sven Ouzman questions these descriptions of Scherz' initial investigation and describes the not easily recognisable fauna as "strange animals"—rough work of animals, possibly giraffe, that did occur at Twyfelfontein.

The Khoikhoi herders produced the geometric imagery, probably depicting herder groups. They are also the creators of the more worldly indentations in that area that served as grinding hollows and game boards. Some of the stones bear marks from use as gong stones; they make unusual sounds when hit.

Archaeology
The archaeological name of the site is Twyfelfontein 534. It is subdivided into 15 smaller sites as described by Scherz in 1975. Objects from the site include a variety of stone tools made mostly from quartzite. Type and shape of these tools indicate not only the use on rock but also the prevalence of wood and leather working. Artwork such as pendants and beads from ostrich eggshell fragments have been found at several places. Of the items of daily use charcoal and bone fragments have been excavated as well as undecorated pottery fragments, although the pottery might have originated from early farmers rather than the Stone Age culture that produced the rock art.

The archaeological value of the site does not compare with its importance as rock art collection. The findings do, however, support the shamanist origin of the engravings because food remains from the site proved to be bones of small antelope, rock dassie and even lizards rather than the large species depicted.

Site protection and recognition

On 15 Aug 1952 the area was declared a National Monument by the South West African administration. Despite its early recognition, the site was left unguarded until 1986 when the entire area was declared a nature reserve. As a result, many of the petroglyphs were damaged or removed. Additionally, visitors have left their own graffiti on the sandstone slabs.

Under Namibian legislation, the site is protected under Section 54 of the National Heritage Act. In 2007, UNESCO approved Twyfelfontein as Namibia's first World Heritage Site as one of the largest concentrations of rock petroglyphs in Africa. The organisation recognised "a coherent, extensive and high quality record of ritual practices relating to hunter-gather communities [...] over at least two millennia" (criterion iii), and "links between ritual and economic practices in the apparent sacred association of the land adjacent to an aquifer" according to criterion V of the cultural selection criteria. Twyfelfontein was Namibia's only World Heritage Site until 2013 when the Namib Sand Sea was listed.

In the  core site, grazing is restricted and the establishment of tourism facilities is prohibited. Although Twyfelfontein is regarded as "generally intact", the Twyfelfontein Country Lodge within the "Zeremonienplatz" (Place of Ceremonies) rock engraving site in the buffer zone is of concern to UNESCO, who stated "This has severely compromised the integrity of the rock engravings in this area." The hiking trail allowed visitors unsupervised access and is seen as running too close to many of the rock-art sites. Site management has, however, improved since applying for World Heritage status, particularly with regards to visitor management; unsupervised hiking is no longer allowed.

References and literature

References

Literature
 
 
 

World Heritage Sites in Namibia
Rock art in Africa
Religious buildings and structures in Namibia
Prehistoric Africa
National Monuments of Namibia
Archaeological sites in Namibia
Former populated places in Namibia